Santiago de Chiquitos is a small town in Roboré Municipality in Chiquitos Province, Santa Cruz Department, Bolivia. The mission of Santiago de Chiquitos is one of the Jesuit Missions of the Chiquitos.

The town is located 467 km east of the city of Santa Cruz de la Sierra and 22 km from the town of Roboré. It has a population of 1,927 as of the 2012 census, and is located within the Tucavaca Valley Municipal Reserve.

History
In 1754, the Jesuit Mission of Santiago de Chiquitos was founded by Jesuit missionaries Gaspar Troncoso and Gaspar Campos.

Languages
Camba Spanish is the most commonly used everyday language. The Santiagueño dialect of Chiquitano is also spoken in the town.

Culture
The annual fiesta takes place on July 25. The town maintains religious musical traditions.

See also

 List of Jesuit sites
 List of the Jesuit Missions of Chiquitos

References

Populated places in Santa Cruz Department (Bolivia)
Buildings and structures in Santa Cruz Department (Bolivia)
Tourist attractions in Santa Cruz Department (Bolivia)
Churches in Bolivia
Jesuit Missions of Chiquitos